Palauig, officially the Municipality of Palauig, is a 3rd class municipality in the province of Zambales, Philippines. According to the 2020 census, it has a population of 39,784 people.

The municipality of Palauig is the nearest mainland to the Philippine-claimed EEZ Panatag Shoal, or Scarborough Shoal.

At present, Palauig is headed by Mayor Billy M. Aceron , with the Municipal Council called Sangguniang Bayan with 8 members, particularly 7 regular Councilors and the Association of Barangay Captains (ABC) President Bel Ponce Altares.

Geography

Barangays
Palauig is politically subdivided into 19 barangays.

 Alwa
 Bato
 Bulawen
 Cauyan
 East Poblacion
 Garreta
 Libaba
 Liozon
 Lipay
 Locloc
 Macarang
 Magalawa
 Pangolingan
 Salaza
 San Juan
 Santo Niño
 Santo Tomas
 San Vicente
 West Poblacion

Climate

Demographics

Language 

Most of the citizens in the municipality speak Sambal followed by Ilocano and Tagalog.

Economy

Tourism 
Palauig is home to the mountain climbing resort of Mount Tapulao. Because of cold climate on its summit similar to Baguio, it has become an attraction to many local and foreign mountaineering groups and tourists. The Municipal Tourism Authority of the Palauig Municipal Government also promotes the Magalawa Island Resort and Famous Beach Resorts along the coastal Barangay of Locloc.

Due to the municipal government's aggressive tourism campaign, local and foreign tourist arrivals in the municipality is on the rise and bringing Palauig as another Tourist destination in Zambales Province.

Special Administrative Zone
 Panatag Shoal (Scarborough Shoal)
 Palauig Point (Parola)(Lighthouse)

Gallery

References

External links

 Palauig Profile at PhilAtlas.com
 [ Philippine Standard Geographic Code]
 Philippine Census Information

Municipalities of Zambales